Differdange (or (locally)) is a commune with town status in south-western Luxembourg,  west from the country's capital. It lies near the borders with Belgium and France and it is located in the canton of Esch-sur-Alzette. With a population of around 26,000, Differdange is the country's third largest city. It is also the main town of the commune, and other towns within the commune include Lasauvage, Niederkorn, Fousbann, and Oberkorn.

Differdange is an industrial town that was home to much of Luxembourg's steel production, much of its development occurred during its heyday. Today, Differdange still remains an important industrial center, with ArcelorMittal, the world's largest steel producer, retaining the ARBED steel plant in the town.

Notable landmarks in Differdange include the Maison de Soins de Differdange, an ancient Cistercian abbey dating back to 1235 and the Differdange Castle, located on a hill in the centre of the town, which dates from 1577 and is now used by Miami University. As such, Differdange is home to Miami University's Dolibois European Center, the university's European campus branch where students study abroad.

Differdange is also home to football team FC Differdange 03.

Populated places 
 
Differdange (commune seat)
Lasauvage
Niederkorn
Oberkorn
Fousbann

History

The Cistercian Era 

The era of the Cistercian cathedrals and abbeys was in full swing during the thirteenth century and Differdange did not deviate from this pattern. In 1235, Alexandre de Soleuvre founded the abbey of Differdange, which he donated to the order of Cîteaux. Initially, the Cistercian abbey welcomed only sisters from the nobility of Luxembourg. Subsequently, women from the Lorraine region of France and the present province of Luxembourg in Wallonia also made their vows at Differdange.

In 1552, the abbey was plundered and sacked by French soldiers. However, it was during the French invasion of Luxembourg that the abbey and the town experienced real raids and innumerable rampages.

The last abbess to direct the convent was Marie-Madeleine de Gourcy, who held office until 1796. After her mandate, the Order was then formally dissolved. The Abbey of Differdange was auctioned off in 1797 and subsequently  be bought by the commune of Differdange in 1929. In 1981 following its purchase by government of Luxembourg, the Differdange Abbey was transformed into a hospital and health center.

The Renaissance Era 

The Differdange Castle is one of the only remaining landmarks from the Renaissance period in the area. Although it has no known origin since all traced manuscripts have disappeared, squire listed was Wilhelm de Differdange, named in documents dating from 1310. The castle is probably the earliest example in Luxembourg of a château built entirely in the Renaissance style. It was intended as a residence and a fortification. Differdange's descendants were extinguished in 1400 with the death of his last grandson. 

In 1552, the castle underwent a disastrous fire, It was eventually restored and occupied by Anna of Isenburg.
In 1794, the French Revolutionary Army committed atrocities in Differdange and slaughtered many unarmed civilians before pillaging and burning the city.

The Iron City 

Beginning in 1830,  Luxembourg's steel industry evolved from and artisan stage to an industrial stage. In 1896, two blast furnaces were erected in Differdange with the name of "Société Anonyme des Hauts-Fourneaux de Differdange". Subsequently, eight other blast furnaces were built, allowing the production of steel beams known at the time as "Differdinger". 

On August 4, 1907, Differdange received its town status by William IV of Luxembourg.

During the 20th century, the industrial boom was at its peak, and the population of Differdange rose from less than 4,000 in 1890 to almost 18,000 by 1930.

In 1967, the "Société des Hauts-Fourneaux and Aciererie de Differdange" merged with several steel companies in Belgium and France to form ARBED, Luxembourg's largest steel company, which had numerous factories in Differdange.

Geography 

The town is located in the plateau of the river Chiers, a tributary of the river Meuse which takes its source in the section of Oberkorn.

Differdange has an altitude of 293 meters, the highest point of the municipality being at 427,1m at Koufeld.

The commune spreads over 2,215 hectares.

Its territory borders France, through the department of Meurthe-et-Moselle in the basin of Longwy.

Population

Notable people 

 Émile Krieps (1920–1998) a resistance leader, soldier, and politician
 Jean Portante (born 1950) a writer of novels, stories, plays, journalistic articles and poetry; resides in Paris
 Josiane Kartheiser (born 1950) a journalist, novelist, and writer
 Nico Helminger (born 1953) an author of poetry, novels, plays and libretti for operas
 Georges Hausemer (1957–2018) a writer of short stories, novels, travelogues and non-fictional works
 Jean-Claude Hollerich S.J. (born 1958) the current archbishop of the Roman Catholic Archdiocese of Luxembourg since 2011

 Sport
 Étienne Bausch (1901–1970) a footballer, competed at the 1924 Summer Olympics
 Émile Kolb (1902–1967) a footballer, competed at the 1924 and 1928 Summer Olympics
 Bernard Fischer (1902–1971) a footballer, competed at the 1928 Summer Olympics
 Paul Feierstein (1903–1963) a footballer, competed at the 1924 and 1928 Summer Olympics 
 Michael Maurer (1904–??) a boxer who competed in the 1924 Summer Olympics 
 Metty Logelin (1907–1999), a gymnast, competed at the 1928 Summer Olympics and the 1936 Summer Olympics
 Arnold Kieffer (1910–1991) a footballer, competed in the 1936 Summer Olympics
 Fernand Ciatti (1912–1989) a boxer, competed at the 1936 Summer Olympics
 Julien Darui (1916–1987) a French football goalkeeper
 Gusty Kemp (1917–1948) a footballer, played 20 times for the national team and competed at the 1936 Summer Olympics
 Paul Anen (1918–1978) a fencer, competed at the 1948 and 1952 Summer Olympics
 Jean-Fernand Leischen (1919–2017) a fencer, competed in three Summer Olympics 
 Nicolas May (1927–2006) a footballer, competed in the 1948 Summer Olympics
 Josy Stoffel (born 1928) a retired gymnast, competed in five consecutive Summer Olympics in 1948, 1952, 1956, 1960 & 1964
 Rudy Kugeler (born 1928) a fencer, competed in the team épée at the 1960 Summer Olympics
 Ferd Lahure (born 1929) a footballer, competed in 1952 Summer Olympics
 Fernand Backes (born 1930) a boxer, competed at the 1952 Summer Olympics
 François Konter (1934–2018) a footballer, played 77 games for the national side
 Roger Menghi (born 1935) a fencer, competed in the individual épée event at the 1976 Summer Olympics
 Roby Hentges (born 1940) a former cyclist, competed in the individual road race at the 1960 Summer Olympics 
 Alain Anen (born 1950) a fencer, competed in the individual and team épée events at the 1972 Summer Olympics

 Politics
 Nicholas Muller (1836–1917) a United States Representative from New York
 Yvonne Useldinger (1921–2009) a politician
 Marcelle Lentz-Cornette (1927–2008) a politician 
 Fred Sunnen (1939–2014) a politician
 Johny Lahure (1942–2003) a politician.
 Félix Braz (born 1966) a politician, the current Minister of Justice

Twin towns — sister cities

Differdange is twinned with:

 Ahlen, Germany
 Chaves, Portugal
 Fiuminata, Italy
 Longwy, France
 Oxford, United States
 Waterloo, Belgium

See also
Harmonie Municipale de la Ville de Differdange, a classical music ensemble, founded in 1884

References

External links

 
 Commune of Differdange official website

 
Cities in Luxembourg
Communes in Esch-sur-Alzette (canton)
Towns in Luxembourg
Miami University